Federico Fabian Peña (born March 15, 1947) is an American politician and attorney who served as the 12th United States secretary of transportation from 1993 to 1997 and the 8th United States secretary of energy from 1997 to 1998, during the presidency of Bill Clinton. He previously served as the 41st mayor of Denver from 1983 to 1991.

Early life
Born in Laredo, Texas, Peña earned a Bachelor of Arts (1969) and Juris Doctor (1972) from the University of Texas at Austin and the University of Texas School of Law, respectively.

Career
Moving to Colorado, where he became a practicing attorney, Peña was elected to the Colorado House of Representatives as a Democrat in 1979, where he rose to become Minority Leader.

Mayor of Denver 
In 1983, Peña defeated William H. McNichols Jr., a 74-year old incumbent, to become the first Hispanic mayor of Denver, a post to which he was re-elected in 1987. During his time as mayor in the late 1980s and early 1990s, he was instrumental in bringing the Colorado Rockies baseball team to Denver in 1993
.

Clinton administration 
Peña advised Arkansas Governor Bill Clinton on transportation issues during Clinton's Presidential transition and thereafter Clinton chose Peña to head the United States Department of Transportation.

In 1995 the Justice Department conducted a preliminary investigation into a California transit agency's awarding of a pension management contract to Peña's former investment management firm. However, Peña had severed all ties to his former company both prior to the contract and prior to becoming Transportation Secretary. On March 17, 1995 Janet Reno ended the investigation.

Although he had intended to leave Clinton's cabinet after a single term, Peña also served as secretary of energy from 1997 to 1998. During his 18-month tenure, Peña led an organization of 16,000 direct employees with a budget of $18 billion. He developed the Clinton administration's Comprehensive National Energy Strategy and oversaw the largest privatization in the history of the U.S Government—the $3.654 billion sale of the Elk Hills Oil Field, formerly known as Naval Petroleum Reserve No. 1. He crafted the Clinton Administration's strategy for oil and gas development in the Caspian Sea region and supported U.S. energy companies' investments around the world.

Later career
Upon leaving the Clinton administration, Peña returned to Denver. In August 1998, he joined private equity firm Vestar Capital Partners where he is a senior advisor.

Peña Boulevard, a freeway in Denver and neighboring Aurora connecting Denver International Airport to Interstate 70, is named for him. As mayor of Denver, Peña led the effort to build the airport. In addition, Peña's vision ("Imagine a Great City") resulted in the revitalization of Denver economy with a new convention center, modernized Cherry Creek Shopping Center, neighborhood retail efforts, expanded library and performing arts center, and recruitment of the Colorado Rockies major league baseball team.

Peña is the father of three children: Nelia, Cristina, and Ryan Peña. The divorce of Federico Peña and his first wife, Ellen Hart Peña, became final on September 10, 2001. Federico Peña married Cindy Velasquez on September 2, 2006. Cindy Velasquez is a former broadcast executive for Channel 7, KMGH-TV, and Channel 9, KUSA-TV, in Denver, Colorado and has a daughter, Pilar.

Peña was a National Co-Chair of the COMPETE Coalition, an organization of energy stakeholders including large power generators, large retail power consumers and energy efficiency/smart grid groups. Today he serves on several corporate boards and is involved in several philanthropic organizations.

On September 7, 2007, Peña announced that he would endorse Senator Barack Obama in the 2008 presidential election, and also serve as Obama's National Campaign Co-chair. The move was notable in that Peña did not endorse Senator Hillary Clinton, the wife of the president under whom he served. On November 5, 2008, he was named to the advisory board of the Obama-Biden Transition Project.

On October 26, 2011, Peña was elected to serve as a member of the Board of Directors of Wells Fargo. Peña was appointed to the University of Denver Board of Trustees in June 2015.

References

External links

 Membership at the Council on Foreign Relations

|-

|-

|-

1947 births
20th-century American politicians
American politicians of Mexican descent
Clinton administration cabinet members
Hispanic and Latino American mayors
Hispanic and Latino American members of the Cabinet of the United States
Hispanic and Latino American state legislators in Colorado
Lawyers from Denver
Living people
Mayors of Denver
Democratic Party members of the Colorado House of Representatives
People from Laredo, Texas
Saint Joseph Academy (Brownsville, Texas) alumni
United States Secretaries of Energy
United States Secretaries of Transportation
University of Denver people
University of Texas School of Law alumni